Aphanomyces is a genus of water moulds. As of 2003 there were about 45 described species. Many of these water moulds are known as economically important pathogens of species of plants and animals, including fish, crustaceans, and agricultural crop plants. Aphanomyces water moulds are "one of the most important yield-limiting factors in production of legumes and sugarbeet."

Some of these water moulds are host-specific, such as A. iridis, which only infects irises. Others can infest several hosts, such as A. euteiches, which grows on several legumes. The disease that manifests in plants infected with these water moulds is sometimes known simply as Aphanomyces root rot or common root rot.

Species include:

Aphanomyces acinetophagus
Aphanomyces americanus
Aphanomyces amphigynus
Aphanomyces apophysii
Aphanomyces astaci – crayfish plague
Aphanomyces balboensis
Aphanomyces bosminae
Aphanomyces brassicae
Aphanomyces camptostylus
Aphanomyces cladogamus
Aphanomyces cochlioides
Aphanomyces coniger
Aphanomyces daphniae
Aphanomyces euteiches
Aphanomyces exoparasiticus
Aphanomyces frigidophilus
Aphanomyces gordejevi
Aphanomyces helicoides
Aphanomyces hydatinae
Aphanomyces invadans – ulcerative mycosis of fish, epizootic ulcerative syndrome, mycotic granulomatosis
Aphanomyces iridis
Aphanomyces irregularis
Aphanomyces keratinophilus
Aphanomyces laevis – cotton-wool disease of fish
Aphanomyces magnusii
Aphanomyces norvegicus
Aphanomyces ovidestruens
Aphanomyces parasiticus
Aphanomyces patersonii
Aphanomyces phycophilus
Aphanomyces pisci
Aphanomyces piscicida
Aphanomyces polysporis
Aphanomyces raphani – black root disease of radish
Aphanomyces salsuginosus
Aphanomyces scaber
Aphanomyces sparrowii
Aphanomyces stellatus 
Aphanomyces volgensis

References

Water mould genera
Saprolegniales